John Mats Arvid Svegfors (born 28 August 1948) is a Swedish journalist and politician. He was the editor-in-chief of Svenska Dagbladet from 1991 to 2000, and governor of Västmanland County from 2000 to 2009.

See also
List of Västmanland Governors

References 

1948 births
Living people
County governors of Sweden